Tutizama Tanito (born 27 November 1993) is a Solomon Islands footballer who plays as a forward for Hekari United from Papua New Guinea. He has also played for Marist Fire from the Solomon Islands.

Tanito has represented the Solomon Islands national football team.

International career

International goals
Scores and results list the Solomon Islands' goal tally first.

References

External links
 

1993 births
Living people
Solomon Islands footballers
Solomon Islands international footballers
Association football forwards
Hekari United players
Solomon Islands expatriate footballers
Expatriate footballers in Papua New Guinea
Marist F.C. players